Ladysmith is an unincorporated community in Clay County, Kansas, United States.  It is located approximately 6.5 miles southwest of Clay Center along Kiowa Rd.

History    
A post office was opened in Ladysmith in 1900, and remained in operation until it was discontinued in 1906.

Education
The community is served by Clay County USD 379 public school district.

References

Further reading

External links
 Clay County maps: Current, Historic, KDOT

Unincorporated communities in Kansas